Troms Police District in Norway includes seventeen municipalities in Troms county with approximately 122,000 people and is headquartered in Tromsø. Troms Police Distrikt covers Troms county except Central Hålogaland.

See also 
 Norwegian Police Service

References

Police districts in Norway
Organisations based in Tromsø